Volleyball at the Lusophone Games was first held in the first edition in Macau, in 2006 when three teams in each men and women's competitions played. Portugal, Macau and India participated in male competition and Portugal, Macau and East Timor took part in women's competitions.

Men's tournament

Medals summary

Women's tournament

Medals summary

 
Volleyball
Lusophony Games